is a 2009 Japanese martial arts film directed and co-written by Fuyuhiko Nishi and starring Rina Takeda.

Plot

A brown belt girl who desperately wants to get a black belt and believes she can qualify for it by facing a group of black belt holders.

Cast
 Rina Takeda as Kei Tsuchiya
 Tatsuya Naka as Yoshiaki Matsumura
 Hisae Watanabe as Shurei
 Yuka Kobayashi
 Akihito Yagi as Kuuken
 Ryuki Takahashi as Ryousuke Nakama
 Sayaka Akimoto as Rika

Reception
The Japan Times gave the film a rating of 2.5 out of 5. Nippon Cinema gave the film an average review. The Hollywood Reporter and Variety gave the film a modest review also.

DVD releases
First Look Studios (America)
 Aspect Ratio: Widescreen (1:78:1) anamorphic
 Sound: Japanese (Dolby Digital 5.1 Surround), English (Dolby Digital 5.1 Surround)
 Subtitles: English
 Supplements: "Making of High Kick Girl!" featurette, "Rina's Action Techniques" featurette, "Naka's Action Techniques" featurette
 Region 1, NTSC

References

External links
  
 

2009 films
2000s Japanese-language films
2009 action films
Fictional karateka
Japanese martial arts films
Karate films
Toei Company films
Japanese sports films
2009 martial arts films
2000s Japanese films